Nina Wedell is a professor of evolutionary biology at the University of Exeter in the United Kingdom. She was appointed as the Australian Research Council Laureate Fellow in 2019. She will investigate the evolutionary dynamics of sexual conflict and insecticide resistance genes at the University of Melbourne. Professor Wedell has pioneered the field of sexual selection, and is best known for her research on female multiple mating, polyandry. Her work has encompassed many insect systems including butterflies, moths, and flies.

Education and career 
Wedell has a B.Sc. (1984), an M.Sc (1986), a Ph.D. (1993), and D.Sc (1997) from Stockholm University. Following her Ph.D, she was a postdoc at the University of Liverpool from 1993 until 1996. Subsequently she held research positions at Stockholm University and the University of Leeds. She took a position at the University of Exeter in 2004 as the Royal Society University Research Fellow. She was promoted to professor in 2009. Since 2018, she has also been the Associate Dean for Research.

Research 
Wedell's research focuses on the evolutionary role of sexual conflict. Her research has demonstrated the role of selfish genetic elements in reproductive biology using interdisciplinary approaches from evolutionary, behavioral and molecular sciences.

Selected publications 

Lindholm, A. K., Dyer, K. A., Firman, R. C., Fishman, L., Forstmeier, W., Holman, L., ... & Price, T. A. (2016). The ecology and evolutionary dynamics of meiotic drive. Trends in ecology & evolution, 31 (4), 315-326.

Awards 
She was awarded the Australian Laureate Fellowship as recognition for her work in evolutionary biology. She received the Royal Society Wolfson Award in 2011. In 2012, she was elected President of the International Society of Behavioural Ecology. The European Molecular Biology Organization elected her as a life-long member in 2014. She is the President-Elect of the European Society of Evolutionary Biology, named in 2015.

References

External links 
 

Living people
Year of birth missing (living people)
Academics of the University of Exeter
Women evolutionary biologists
Royal Society Wolfson Research Merit Award holders
Stockholm University alumni